The list of ship launches in 2014 includes a chronological list of ships launched in 2014.


See also

References

2014
Ship launches
 
Ship launches